The Asia Culture Center, also referred to as ACC, is an arts complex in Gwangju, South Korea. It was opened in November 2015. It consists of five main buildings: the ACC Culture Exchange; the ACC Children; the ACC Archive & Research; the ACC Creation; and the ACC Theater. The center is a member of South Korea's Ministry of Culture, Sports and Tourism(MCST).

References

External links 

Facebook
Instagram

Buildings and structures in Gwangju
Arts centres in South Korea